Aldo Agroppi (born 14 April 1944) is a professional Italian football coach and a former footballer, who played as a midfielder.

Club career

Agroppi played for 12 seasons (249 games, 17 goals) in Serie A with clubs Torino Calcio and Perugia Calcio. An important player for Torino, he made over 200 appearances for the club, winning two Coppa Italia titles.

International career
Agroppi made his international debut for the Italy national football team on 17 June 1972 in a game against Romania.

Managerial career
As a coach, Agroppi managed several Italian clubs throughout his career: Pescara, Pisa, Perugia, Padova, Fiorentina, Como, and Ascoli. He coached Fiorentina on two occasions: he firstly coached the team during the 1985–86 season, leading the club to a fourth-place finish in Serie A, although he was subsequently banned from football for 4 months for his involvement in the Totonero 1986 match-fixing scandal during his spells with Perugia; he later returned to manage the team in the 1992–93 season, but with less success, as the club were relegated to Serie B at the end of the season.

Honours

Club
Torino
Coppa Italia: 1967–68, 1970–71

Individual
 Torino F.C. Hall of Fame: 2017

References

1944 births
Living people
Italian footballers
Italy international footballers
People from Piombino
Serie A players
Serie B players
Torino F.C. players
Ternana Calcio players
Potenza S.C. players
A.C. Perugia Calcio players
Italian football managers
Serie A managers
Delfino Pescara 1936 managers
Pisa S.C. managers
A.C. Perugia Calcio managers
Calcio Padova managers
ACF Fiorentina managers
Como 1907 managers
Ascoli Calcio 1898 F.C. managers
Association football midfielders
Sportspeople from the Province of Livorno
Footballers from Tuscany